The Australian Champions League, formerly the SA Champions League, is an annual Australian rules football tournament, held in March, between invited teams from metropolitan and country leagues. Invitations are targeted at the premiership teams from each competition.

Competition Winners

2018 Australian Champions League 
The 2018 edition of the Australian Champions League was held on 24 March 2018 at Denise Norton Park (Pardipardinyilla), Adelaide.  It was won by the Rostrevor Old Collegians Football Club.

Competing Teams

Results

2017 Australian Champions League 
The re-branded 2017 edition of the Australian Champions League was held on 25 March 2017 at Thebarton Oval.  It was won by the Waikerie Football Club.

Competing Teams

Results

2016 SA Champions League 
The inaugural SA Champions League was held on 12 March 2016 at Thebarton Oval, South Australia.  The competition was won by the Reynella Football Club.

Competing Teams

Results

References 

Australian rules football competitions in South Australia
2016 establishments in Australia